Jean-Pierre Stock (5 April 1900 – 2 October 1950) was a French rower who competed in the 1924 Summer Olympics. In 1924 he won the silver medal with his partner Marc Detton in the double sculls event at the age of 24.

References

External links
 Jean-Pierre Stock's profile at databaseOlympics

1900 births
1950 deaths
French male rowers
Olympic rowers of France
Rowers at the 1924 Summer Olympics
Olympic silver medalists for France
Olympic medalists in rowing
Medalists at the 1924 Summer Olympics
European Rowing Championships medalists
20th-century French people